Zinc finger Y-chromosomal protein is a protein that in humans is encoded by the ZFY gene of the Y chromosome.

This gene encodes a zinc finger-containing protein that may function as a transcription factor. This gene was once a candidate gene for the testis-determining factor (TDF) and was erroneously referred to as TDF.

Humans express a single ZFY gene with two splice variants. While mice express two paralogous copies, Zfy1 and Zfy2.  During spermatogenesis, wrongful expression of either Zfy1 or Zfy2 results in programmed cell death, apoptosis, at the mid-pachytene checkpoint. In mice, Zfy genes are necessary for meiotic sex chromosome inactivation (MSCI). In Zfy knockout spermatocytes, sex chromosomes are incorrectly silenced. Thus, Zfy performs three functions at the mid-pachytene checkpoint: (1) promote MSCI, (2) monitor MSCI progress, and (3) execute cells, via apoptosis, that fail to undergo MSCI.

In humans, ZFY is most broadly expresses in the testis and prostate. However, 20 other tissues also express ZFY, such as esophagus, urinary bladder, bone marrow, small intestine, appendix and gall bladder.

Disorders associated with the ZFY gene include campomelic dysplasia, cystadenofibroma, and Frasier syndrome.

References

Further reading 

 
 
 
 
 
 
 
 
 
 
 
 
 

Genes on human chromosome Y